Manyamkonda is a hill shrine of Lord Venkateshwara, located 5 km from Devarakadra town on the National highway 167 to Raichur.

The ideal time to visit this temple is at the time of Jaathara, celebrated every year during January or February.  It is also called the "Palamoor Tirupathi".

Hindu temples in Telangana